Lynne Walker (24 October 1956 – 10 February 2011) was a British music and theatre critic. Walker was a regular broadcaster for the BBC.

Born in Edinburgh, she attended the Mary Erskine School. She won a medal at the end of her time at Napier College in 1976, and gained a degree from the Huddersfield School of Music (now part of Huddersfield University). At the Huddersfield School, she studied oboe, the piano and conducting. It was at this time that Walker became drawn to the Huddersfield Contemporary Music Festival, and gained a scholarship to study choral conducting in France under Arthur Oldham.

Her early career was as a musician, but she migrated to marketing and publicity in the early 1980s working for the Royal Scottish National Orchestra in Glasgow being involved in the RSNO's Music Nova (New Music) festival and editing the orchestra's journal, SNOscene. She performed a similar role For the Royal Exchange theatre in Manchester (1987–94). In 1991 she began her own editorial consultancy Edgewise with the music critic Gerald Larner, whom she had married in 1989. Together, the couple wrote music programmes for the Barbican Centre, Wigmore Hall and other concert venues. (Larner died in December 2018.) Walker was appointed programme editor for the Edinburgh International Festival in 1992.

Simultaneously she had begun a freelance career in journalism and broadcasting. For about a decade, until the programme was dropped in 1998, she was a contributor to (and for its last two years presenter) of the BBC Radio 4 arts magazine Kaleidoscope. She also hosted the Radio 3 programme In Tune.

By 2000 she was a more regular contributor to The Independent, responsible for the newspaper's coverage of theatre events at the Edinburgh Festival, feature articles and arts criticism with an emphasis on the north of England.

Lynne Walker died in Alderley Edge, Cheshire having suffered from cancer for ten years.

References

1956 births
2011 deaths
Journalists from Edinburgh
British music critics
British women music critics
Women theatre critics
BBC Radio 3 presenters
Deaths from cancer in England
British arts administrators
Mass media people from Edinburgh
Scottish radio personalities
The Independent people
People educated at the Mary Erskine School
Alumni of Edinburgh Napier University